Oswaldo Blanco (born May 21, 1991) is a Colombian professional footballer who plays as a forward for Alianza in the Primera División.

Career

Club career
Blanco joined Alianza FC in El Salvador for the 2020 season.

References

External links

1991 births
Living people
Colombian footballers
Colombian expatriate footballers
Atlético Nacional footballers
Deportivo Merlo footballers
Club Atlético Los Andes footballers
América de Cali footballers
Club Atlético Acassuso footballers
Deportivo Laferrere footballers
Sportivo Italiano footballers
Alianza F.C. footballers
Primera Nacional players
Primera B Metropolitana players
Primera C Metropolitana players
Categoría Primera A players
Categoría Primera B players
Association football forwards
Sportspeople from Cartagena, Colombia
Colombian expatriate sportspeople in Argentina
Colombian expatriate sportspeople in El Salvador
Expatriate footballers in Argentina
Expatriate footballers in El Salvador